Parliamentary elections were held in Burundi on 29 June 1993. They were the first multi-party parliamentary elections since 1965, and followed the approval of a new constitution in a referendum in 1992. The result was a victory for the Front for Democracy in Burundi, which won 65 of the 81 seats.

Campaign
Six political parties and eight independents took part in the election
Front for Democracy in Burundi (FRODEBU) - a predominantly Hutu party founded by Melchior Ndadaye in 1986. It was officially registered as a political party in 1992.
People's Party (PP) - a predominantly Hutu party.
People's Reconciliation Party (PRP) - a monarchist party led by Pierre-Claver Sendegeya.
Rally for Democracy and Economic and Social Development (RADDES) - a predominantly Tutsi party who supported Pierre Buyoya in the presidential election.
Rally for the People of Burundi (RPB) - a predominantly Hutu party that supported Melchior Ndadaye in the presidential election.
Union for National Progress (UPRONA) - predominantly Tutsi and former sole legal party led by Pierre Buyoya.

Results

References

Elections in Burundi
Burundi
Election, legislative
June 1993 events in Africa